Lefki is a former municipality in the Lasithi regional unit, eastern Crete, Greece. Since the 2011 local government reform it is part of the municipality Sitia, of which it is a municipal unit. Population 1,697 (2011). The seat of the municipality was in Ziros.

References

Populated places in Lasithi